Brigitte Le Juez (born 5 October 1959) is an author and academic at Dublin City University.

Published works
 Beckett avant la lettre, Grasset, 2007.
 Clerges et cultures populaires, Publications de l'Universite de Saint-Etienne, 2004.
 Le Papegai et le papelard dans "Un Cœur simple" de Gustave Flaubert, Rodopi, 1999.
 Modern French Short Fiction, Manchester University Press, 1994.
 Irlande, Larousse, 1989.

External links
 Brigitte Le Juez at the European Network for Comparative Literature Studies site

Academics of Dublin City University
1959 births
Living people